The following is a list of Oxford United Football Club managers from 1949, when the club turned professional, to the present day. During this time the club has had 25 full-time managers, of whom three (Jim Smith, Denis Smith and Darren Patterson) have had more than one spell in the post, and eleven periods of caretaker-management. The first manager appointed was Harry Thompson in July 1949. Thompson was in charge for nine years, during which he led the team to the Southern League title in 1953, as well as the Southern League Cup in 1953 and 1954. He was dismissed in November 1958 and replaced by Arthur Turner. Turner, the longest-serving manager in the club's history with more than a decade in charge, led United to back-to-back Southern League titles, of which the second, in 1962, resulted in their election to the Football League. Promotion followed from the Fourth Division in 1965, and the club were crowned Third Division champions three years later. Turner left the club nine months after this success. Over the next 13 years, five managers took charge: Ron Saunders, Gerry Summers, Mick Brown, Bill Asprey and Ian Greaves. During Brown's four-year run, United were relegated back to the Third Division after eight years in the Second.

Jim Smith started his first spell as manager in 1982, and led Oxford into the top tier of English football after consecutive promotions as champions in 1984 and 1985. However, he moved to Queens Park Rangers before the 1985–86 season, so never managed Oxford in the First Division. New manager, former chief scout Maurice Evans, had immediate success winning the 1986 League Cup, beating his predecessor's new club in the final. For the next 24 years, the only manager to guide the club to promotion or silverware was Denis Smith, who won promotion from the Second Division in 1996. Ramón Díaz, the club's first non-British manager, took charge for five months between December 2004 and May 2005. Jim Smith returned as manager at the end of the 2005–06 season, shortly before Oxford United were relegated to the Football Conference after 44 years in the Football League.

Having missed out on promotion in the 2006–07 season, Smith resigned and manager Darren Patterson was hired in November 2007. Patterson was sacked over a year later and was replaced by Chris Wilder, who won promotion back to the Football League by winning the 2010 Conference play-off final.

Wilder resigned in January 2014 and was announced as the new manager of Northampton Town the following day. He was replaced by Gary Waddock, who lasted four months, before himself being replaced by Michael Appleton. Appleton, having gained promotion to League One and led the club to two Wembley finals in the Football League Trophy, left the club after three seasons in charge to join Leicester City as their assistant manager. He was replaced by Pep Clotet, former assistant manager at Leeds United, in July 2017. Clotet was sacked on 22 January 2018, with a record of 12 wins from 36 matches in charge. After two months under the caretaker management of Derek Fazackerley, Karl Robinson was appointed by new owner Sumrith Thanakarnjanasuth on 22 March with United 15th in League One and only six points above the relegation zone.

Managers
Manager dates and statistics are sourced from Howland, Complete Record up to and including Lawrenson, 
and from Soccerbase thereafter.
Results in competitions not recorded by Soccerbase are sourced from The English Football Archive.
Only professional, competitive matches are counted. Statistics are complete up to and including 21 March 2021.
Key

P: Matches played
W: Matches won
D: Matches drawn
L: Matches lost

References
General

Specific

 
Lists of association football managers by club in England
Oxford-related lists